Oscar Natalio Maturin Landeros (born 30 June 1979) is a Mexican footballer.

External links

1979 births
Living people
Sportspeople from Culiacán
Footballers from Sinaloa
Association football defenders
Atlante F.C. footballers
Nejapa footballers
Expatriate footballers in El Salvador
Mexican expatriate sportspeople in El Salvador
Mexican footballers
Mexican expatriate footballers